USS Knox (DE/FF-1052) was the lead ship of her class of destroyer escorts in the United States Navy. Knox was named for Commodore Dudley Wright Knox, and was the second US Navy ship named Knox. In 1975, she was redesignated a frigate. She served from 1969 to 1992, and was sunk as a target in 2007.

Design and description
The Knox-class design was derived from the  modified to extend range and without a long-range missile system. They displaced  at full load. Their crew consisted of 16 officers and 211 enlisted men.

The ships were equipped with one Westinghouse geared steam turbine that drove the single propeller shaft.

The Knox-class ships were armed with a single /54 caliber Mark 42 gun. They mounted an eight-round ASROC launcher between the 5-inch gun and the bridge. Close-range anti-submarine defense was provided by two twin  Mk 32 torpedo tubes. The ships were equipped with a torpedo-carrying DASH drone helicopter; its telescoping hangar and landing pad were positioned amidships aft of the mack. Beginning in the 1970s, the DASH was replaced by a SH-2 Seasprite LAMPS I helicopter and the hangar and landing deck were accordingly enlarged. Most ships had an eight-cell BPDMS missile launcher added in the early 1970s.

Construction 
She was laid down 5 October 1965, by Todd Pacific Shipyards, Seattle, Washington; launched 19 November 1966; sponsored by Mrs. Peter A. Sturtevant, the granddaughter of Commodore Knox; and was commissioned on 12 April 1969, with Commander William A. Lamm in command.

Service history 
Knox performed search and rescue operations and provided evacuation, blockade, and surveillance support, when necessary, for the Pacific Fleet. In April 1975, Knox participated in Operation Eagle Pull, the evacuation of Phnom Penh, Cambodia. Knox was redesignated a frigate on 30 June 1975 as FF-1052.

Disposition 
Decommissioned on 14 February 1992, Knox was stricken from the Naval Vessel Register on 11 January 1995.  NAVSEA temporarily placed Knox on the donation hold list but removed her from the list around 2003. Knox was sunk as a target off Guam, during "Exercise Valiant Shield" (2007) on 7 August 2007.

Awards, citations and campaign ribbons

Gallery

In Popular Culture

Knox appears in the original Hawaii Five-O (1968 TV series) season 8 episode Murder: Eyes Only.

Notes

References

External links 

 USS Knox (DE/FF-1052) Reunion Association
 
   hazegray.org: USS Knox

Ships built in Seattle
Knox-class frigates
Cold War frigates and destroyer escorts of the United States
1966 ships
Ships sunk as targets
Shipwrecks in the Pacific Ocean